The Trinity River Authority (TRA) was formed in 1955 by the Texas legislature. Its main concerns are water supply and water conservation in the Trinity River Basin. The general offices of the authority are located in Arlington, Texas.

Dams and reservoirs 
Since 1911, 31 major reservoirs have been constructed in the drainage basin of the Trinity River, 29 of which fall under the jurisdiction of the Trinity River Authority.

 Lake Anahuac
 Lake Arlington
 Lake Amon G. Carter
 Lake Bardwell
 Benbrook Lake
 Lake Bridgeport
 Cedar Creek Reservoir
 Fairfield Lake
 Grapevine Lake
 Lake Halbert

 Houston County Lake
 Lake Ray Hubbard
 Lake Lavon
 Lewisville Lake
 Lost Creek Reservoir
 Lake Livingston
 Eagle Mountain Lake
 Joe Pool Lake
 Mountain Creek Lake
 Navarro Mills Lake

 North Lake
 Richland-Chambers Reservoir
 Ray Roberts Lake
 New Terrell City Lake
 Trinidad Lake
 Wallisville Lake
 Lake Waxahachie
 Lake Weatherford
 Lake Worth

See also 
 List of Texas river authorities
 List of Trinity River tributaries

References

External links 
 Official site

Trinity River (Texas)
River authorities of Texas
State agencies of Texas
Water companies of the United States
Companies based in Arlington, Texas
Public utilities established in 1955
1955 establishments in Texas